Music&NEW (stylized MUSIC&NEW, Hangul:뮤직앤뉴), a subsidiary of Next Entertainment World, is a South Korean company that specializes in the production and distribution of music content.

History
MUSIC & NEW is Next Entertainment World's music content distribution division. It started to run its music production and management business in 2012. At now, MUSIC & NEW is focusing on investment and distribution of established / new / potential artists' music and produce divers contents through OSMU. In 2012, the company hosted the "i am a musician" project with Soribada, which is a project seeking to find new composers. In the first half year of 2016, MUSIC & NEW was ranked in 1st Production company and 4th Distribution company in gaon chart Korea. Moreover, Music & New will strengthen its position as a global company. Through partnerships with international labels, MUSIC & NEW will provide new vision for music distribution service.

Former artists
 Lyn
 Lee Young-hyun
 MC the Max (2012-2016)
 OH!nle (Playground sub-label)
 Sweet Sorrow
VIBE
Big Mama

References

External links
 
 
 

Next Entertainment World
South Korean record labels
Labels distributed by Kakao M
Record labels established in 2012
Defunct record labels of South Korea